Below is a listing of all South African rugby union players that have represented the Blitzbokke since 1993.

The "Years" column indicates the years during which each player was active. Tournaments that formed part of the Sevens World Series since its formalisation in 1999 are displayed for the date range of the relevant season.

See also

 South Africa national rugby sevens team
 Rugby World Cup Sevens
 Sevens World Series
 Rugby sevens at the Commonwealth Games
 Rugby union at the World Games

References

External links
 

National rugby sevens teams
 
sevens